Tylopilus chromoreticulatus is a bolete fungus in the family Boletaceae found in Yunnan, China, where it grows under Pinus densata. It was described as new to science in 1993.

References

External links

chromoreticulatus
Fungi described in 1993
Fungi of China